Kevin Paul Eltife (born March 1, 1959) is an American businessman and former politician from Tyler, Texas. A Republican, served in the Texas Senate from 2004 through 2017. He was sworn in on August 15, 2004, after winning a special election to represent District 1. He declined to seek re-election in 2016 and was succeeded in office by fellow Republican Bryan Hughes.

Early life and education
Eltife was born in Tyler, Texas, and grew up there. He is a Lebanese American; all of his grandparents immigrated to the United States from Lebanon. His father died when he was under two years old.

Business and political career
Eltife is the owner and operator of Eltife Properties, a commercial real estate company.

He first entered politics in 1991, when he ran for a city council seat. He subsequently served as mayor of Tyler for two terms (six years).

He defeated Paul Sadler in the special election for Texas Senate; in 2012, Sadler was the unsuccessful Democratic nominee against Ted Cruz for one of the two Texas seats in the United States Senate. The position opened when state Senator and former Lieutenant Governor Bill Ratliff of Mount Pleasant resigned with less than a year remaining in his state Senate term.

Eltife was a strong proponent of raising sales taxes and reducing property taxes. He wishes to use additional sales tax revenue to reduce the debt of the Texas Department of Transportation.

He was considered one of the most liberal of the nineteen (as of 2013) Texas Senate Republicans, along with Robert L. Duncan of Lubbock, Kel Seliger of Amarillo, Bob Deuell of Greenville, and John Carona of Dallas, according to an analysis by Mark P. Jones of the political science department at Rice University in Houston. Jones also found that these Republicans saw passage of 90 percent of the bills for which they voted. Of these five senators, Deuell lost a runoff election on May 27, 2014, and Carona was narrowly defeated for re-nomination on March 4. Duncan, meanwhile, resigned from the Senate to become chancellor of the Texas Tech University System.

In 2015, Eltife announced that he would not seek reelection to the Senate in 2016. He was succeeded in office by Republican state Representative Bryan Hughes of Mineola, who defeated Republican state Representative David Simpson of Longview in the Republican primary and automatically won the seat because there was no Democratic opponent.

In January 2017, Governor Greg Abbott appointed Eltife, along with two others, as a regent of the University of Texas System.

Electoral history

2006

2004

References

External links
Senate of Texas - Senator Kevin Eltife official TX Senate website
Project Vote Smart - Senator Kevin P. Eltife (TX) profile
Follow the Money - Kevin Eltife
2006 campaign contributions

|-

1959 births
21st-century American politicians
American people of Lebanese descent
Businesspeople from Texas
Living people
Mayors of places in Texas
People from Tyler, Texas
Texas city council members
Republican Party Texas state senators
Presidents pro tempore of the Texas Senate
McCombs School of Business alumni